"This Sucks." (stylized as "this sucks.") is a song co-written and recorded by Canadian pop artist Virginia to Vegas and Canadian country pop artist MacKenzie Porter. The two wrote the song with Lowell, Nathan Ferraro, and Mike Wise, while Wise co-produced the track with Virginia to Vegas.

Background
Derik John Baker, known professionally as "Virginia to Vegas", stated that "This Sucks." is "about what seeing an ex with someone else does to you. You're happy for them because you once loved them, but the only words you can find to explain how you're feeling are 'Wow, this really sucks right now.'". Baker remarked that he had heard a song from Porter on the radio while driving to the grocery store and believed it would be "perfect" to have her join him on the song.

Critical reception
Kerry Doole of FYI Music News stated that "This Sucks." was written in Virginia to Vegas' "signature electro-pop style," adding that it "features his plaintive vocals effectively paired with Porter’s clear delivery". The Reviews Are In described the song as a "fantastic and unexpected collaboration on a song that hits your feelings but keeps the same pop-driven, foot-tapping, uptempo groove we’re used to from [Virginia to Vegas]". Michael O'Connor Marotta of Vanyaland said the track "tackles" the subject of seeing "an ex-lover while out and about" with "electro-pop vigour". Lefuturewave noted "an engaging tone," saying the "chorus’ electronic-influenced style will keep listeners spellbound". Enigma Online said the track was "driven with a quintessential pop beat but feels melancholy at its core," adding it is "the perfect soundtrack to one of the year’s least favorite transitions" as summer transitions to fall.

Charts

References

2021 songs
2021 singles
Virginia to Vegas songs
MacKenzie Porter songs
Songs written by Virginia to Vegas
Songs written by MacKenzie Porter
Casablanca Records singles
Republic Records singles
Male–female vocal duets
Song recordings produced by Mike Wise (record producer)
Songs written by Mike Wise (record producer)
Songs written by Lowell (musician)